Annie Liu Sum-yau (born 1 April 1981) is a Hong Kong-based Taiwanese actress.

Background 
Liu was born in Taiwan but was sent to Vancouver, Canada to study at a young age by her parents. In 2004, Liu was selected to feature in a TV commercial of China Airlines, the largest airline and flag carrier of Taiwan. Before starting her acting career in 2005, Liu studied industrial design at Vancouver's Emily Carr University of Art and Design. 

Liu debuted as the female lead in the 2005 star-studded film, Mob Sister, and earned a Best New Performer nomination at the 25th Hong Kong Film Awards for her performance. Since her acting debut, Liu has moved to Hong Kong to pursue her acting career and has been leading several films and TV series. Although she focuses her career in the film acting, occasionally she would take on TV series acting and variety show hosting projects. She is currently running her own management company.

Filmography

Awards & Nominations

2018 
 2018: (TVB Anniversary Gala) My Favourite TVB Drama Character (Singapore) Nomination (Deep in the Realm of Conscience) 
 2018: (TVB Anniversary Gala) My Favourite TVB Drama Character (Malaysia) Nomination (Deep in the Realm of Conscience)

References

External links 
 
 Annie Liu at hkmdb.com
 Annie Liu at chinesemov.com
 Annie Liu at Sina Weibo

1981 births
Living people
21st-century Hong Kong actresses
21st-century Taiwanese actresses
Hong Kong film actresses
Taiwanese film actresses
Hong Kong television actresses
Taiwanese television actresses
Hong Kong female models
Taiwanese female models
Taiwanese expatriates in Hong Kong
Emily Carr University of Art and Design alumni
Taiwanese-born Hong Kong artists